Sara Mishara is an American-Canadian cinematographer, who won the Canadian Screen Award for Best Cinematography at the 7th Canadian Screen Awards in 2019 for her work on the film The Great Darkened Days (La grande noirceur), and at the 10th Canadian Screen Awards in 2022 for Drunken Birds (Les Oiseaux ivres), and the Prix Iris for Best Cinematography at the 24th Quebec Cinema Awards for Drunken Birds.

She was also a dual nominee in the same year for Allure, and was previously nominated in the same category at the 28th Genie Awards for Everything Is Fine (Tout est parfait) and at the 4th Canadian Screen Awards for Felix and Meira (Félix et Meira). She received four previous Prix Jutra nominations for Best Cinematography for her work on Continental, a Film Without Guns (Continental, un film sans fusil), The Legacy (La Donation), All That You Possess (Tout ce que tu possèdes) and You're Sleeping Nicole (Tu dors Nicole).

Born in Boston, Massachusetts, she studied film at Concordia University and the Prague Film School. She was a cowriter with Ivan Grbovic of the films Romeo Eleven (Roméo Onze) and Drunken Birds, with the duo receiving a Jutra nomination for Best Screenplay for Romeo Eleven (Roméo Onze) at the 15th Jutra Awards in 2013, and winning for Drunken Birds at the 24th Quebec Cinema Awards in 2022.

References

External links

21st-century Canadian screenwriters
Canadian cinematographers
Canadian women screenwriters
Best Cinematography Genie and Canadian Screen Award winners
American emigrants to Canada
Concordia University alumni
People from Boston
Canadian women cinematographers
Living people
Year of birth missing (living people)
Best Cinematography Jutra and Iris Award winners